Marcos Mathías (born 12 May 1970) is a Venezuelan footballer. He played in 18 matches for the Venezuela national football team from 1993 to 1997. He was also part of Venezuela's squad for the 1993 Copa América tournament.

References

External links
 

1970 births
Living people
Venezuelan footballers
Venezuela international footballers
Place of birth missing (living people)
Association football defenders
Trujillanos FC players
Deportivo Miranda F.C. players
Venezuelan football managers
Mineros de Guayana managers
Carabobo F.C. managers
Deportivo Anzoátegui managers
Aragua F.C. managers